Janet E. Petro is an American engineer and civil servant currently serving as the 11th director of NASA's John F. Kennedy Space Center. She was appointed by NASA Administrator Bill Nelson on June 30, 2021, making her the first woman to serve as director. Petro previously served as deputy director at the John F. Kennedy Space Center.

Education and early life
Born in Michigan, Janet Petro's father moved the family to the Florida space coast when he received a job from NASA to work on the Kennedy Space Center's Mercury and Gemini Programs. She grew up in Satellite Beach and attended Surfside Elementary, DeLaura Middle and Satellite High School. Janet Petro graduated in 1981 from the United States Military Academy at West Point, with a Bachelor of Science in engineering and was in the second class of graduates at West Point to include women. She also has a Master of Science in business administration from Boston University.

Early career 
Janet Petro began her career as a commissioned officer in the U.S. Army, upon graduation from the US Military Academy.  While serving in the Army, she was assigned to the U.S Army's Aviation Branch, where she piloted helicopters and lead troop assignments in Germany. she went on to work for Science Applications International Corporation in various management positions and McDonnell Douglas Aerospace Corporation, where she worked as a mechanical engineer and payload specialist before starting at NASA.

Deputy director 
As Deputy Director of the John F. Kennedy Space Center, Janet Petro led in the transition of the center into a multi-user spaceport. For 12-months, she served an appointment at NASA's headquarters in Washington, D.C., as the deputy associate administrator and acting director for the Office of Evaluation where she was responsible for managing cross agency initiatives, assisting in managing the center's 9,000 civil service and contractor employees, and executing NASA space mission operations. Following the retirement of the Space Shuttle Program in 2011, she has aided in helping NASA establish the center's direction as the an efficient multiuser spaceport in the United States. She was also the first woman to hold the position as deputy director.

Awards 
In 2018, Janet Petro was selected by the Florida Governor to be inducted into the Florida Women's Hall of Fame. In 2019 she was awarded the Samuel J. Heyman Service to America Sammies Management Excellence Medal. She is also the recipient of the President's Distinguished executive award, and the Silver Snoopy Award.

References

American women engineers
United States Army officers
21st-century American women
1960 births
Living people
Florida Women's Hall of Fame Inductees